William Bramwell Withers (27 July 1823 – 14 July 1913) was a journalist, historian, and novelist best known for A History of Ballarat from the first pastoral settlement to the present time (1870). Born in England, Withers moved to Natal, South Africa in 1949 and contributed to newspapers such as the Natal Witness. He moved to Victoria, Australia in 1952, working odd jobs before becoming a reporter for the Argus and the Herald in Melbourne.

By 1855, Withers was living in Ballarat, Victoria, where he worked as a journalist for the Ballarat Times, the Ballarat Star, the Miner and Weekly Star and later the Ballarat Courier. Withers endeavored to write a history of Ballarat, spending five years of research before the first edition was published in 1870 to great praise. A second edition was published in 1887. He also wrote two novels and served on the first committee of the mechanics' institute. In 1901, Withers left for Sydney, where he died in 1913.

Early life
William Bramwell Withers was born on 27 July 1823 in Whitchurch, Hampshire, England. He was the youngest son of tenant farmer and Wesleyan lay preacher Jason Withers and his second wife, Elizabeth , who died in 1929. Withers was educated at a grammar school until the age of thirteen, when he was apprenticed by his uncle, a storekeeper in Winchester. A lifelong opponent of capital punishment, he wrote articles in temperance and vegetarian journals.

After his father died in 1946, Withers used the £300 left to him to buy  in Natal, South Africa. He moved there in 1849 and contributed to the Natal Witness and Natal Standard.

Australia

Victoria and Ballarat 
In November 1952, Withers reached Melbourne in Victoria, Australia and walked to Ballarat, but failed as a gold prospector and returned to Melbourne. He was employed as a roadmaker, a drayman and a clerk on the wharves before joining the Argus as a reader and later reporter in 1854, then transferring to the Herald.

By June 1855, Withers had returned to Ballarat. His failure to find gold continued. He worked as a reporter and part-time compositor at the Ballarat Times before joining the newly founded Ballarat Star on 22 September 1855, and was the mining correspondent for both the Star and the Miner and Weekly Star. Austin McCallum, in Withers' entry in the Australian Dictionary of Biography, said that he "proved a fluent and scholarly journalist" and added "appealing humour" to his reporting. Withers was elected to the first committee of the mechanics' institute in 1859 and was a founder of the Ballarat Bowling Club in 1865, becoming the first champion bowler. He lived on Lyons Street with Mary Ann Dusatoy.

Endeavoring to write a history of Ballarat, Withers spent five years researching and contacting surviving squatters, mining pioneers and those involved with the Eureka Rebellion. His History of Ballarat, in full A History of Ballarat from the first pastoral settlement to the present time, was published by the Star in twelve weekly parts from 11 June 1870. Bound volumes were sold from 9 August and two other editions were published. The History was praised by reviewers for Withers' thorough research, objectivity and style. One of the first major accounts of the Eureka Rebellion, Kent Ball, a librarian at the State Library Victoria, described it as a "classic research resource". According to historian Clare Wright, the History first perpetuated the myth that the Australian goldfields were exclusively male, despite this only applying to the earlies days of the gold rush. Withers briefly served as co-proprietor of the Star with Henry Nicholls and E. E. Campbell.

Withers wrote two novels which were widely serialized: Eustace Hopkins (1882), which won second place in a competition of 120 sponsored by The Age, and The Westons (1883), which was published in the Melbourne World and Federal Australian. After the Star was sold, Withers was hired by the Ballarat Courier. In 1887, Francis Niven published a second edition of A History of Ballarat, which was revised and illustrated. 10,200 copies were printed for one guinea, but sales were slow. He also wrote Ballarat Chronicles and Pictures and Reminiscences of the '50's and '60's.

Sydney 
Withers moved to Sydney in 1901, but continued to write for the Courier. By 1907, he was living in the suburb of Dulwich Hill with Dusatoy and her son William Leslie Withers Dusatoy. Withers visited England and returned to Winchester, leaving on 19 March 1903. He wrote about his experiences in the Star, which were published as 'A Pilgrim Pioneer' from September to December. The Dictionary notes that his writing had become "pedantic". Withers died of a cerebral hemorrhage on 14 July 1913 in Dulwich Hill and was buried at Rookwood Cemetery, leaving his estate of £90 to Mary Ann Dusatoy.

Character
The Dictionary described Withers as "short, bristly whiskered, long-striding, frock-coated" with an umbrella "always [...] under arm" and having a "gentle character".

Bibliography
Eustace Hopkins: His Friends and Foes (1882)
The Westons (1883)
History of Ballarat, from the first pastoral settlement to the present time (1870)
History of Ballarat (2nd ed.) (1887)
Ballarat Chronicles and Pictures
Reminiscences of the '50s and '60s (1895–96)

References

Bibliography and further reading

External links

1823 births
1913 deaths
Australian journalists
19th-century Australian historians